Woodleigh is a large meteorite impact crater (astrobleme) in Western Australia, centred on Woodleigh Station east of Shark Bay, Gascoyne region. A team of four scientists at the Geological Survey of Western Australia and the Australian National University, led by Arthur J. Mory, announced the discovery in the 15 April 2000 issue of Earth and Planetary Science Letters.

Description 

The crater is not exposed at the surface and therefore its size is uncertain.
  
The central uplift, interpreted to be  in diameter, was first intersected by drilling activities in the late 1970s; however its significance as an impact structure was only realised in 1997 during a gravity survey. In 1999, a new core sample was taken. The thin veins of melted glass, breccia, and shocked quartz found would have formed under pressures 100,000 times greater than atmospheric pressure at sea level, or between 10 and 100 times greater than those generated by volcanic or earthquake activity. Only a large impact could have generated such conditions. The reported discovery in 2018 of the extremely rare mineral reidite in a drillcore sample from the central uplift zone, supports the interpretation of the crater as being over 100 km in diameter, and possibly the largest in Australia.

The Woodleigh impact event, originally thought in the early 2000s to have occurred between 259 Ma to 201 Ma (or between the Late Permian and Late Triassic) is now thought to date from 364 ± 8 million years (Late Devonian). This time corresponds approximately to the Late Devonian extinction of about 370 million years ago. There is evidence for other large impact events at around the same time, such as the East Warburton Basin, so if the extinction is related to impact, perhaps more than one crater was involved.

Of the two dozen or more impact craters known in Australia, the three largest are Woodleigh, Acraman, and Tookoonooka. The Gnargoo structure, which has remarkable similarities to Woodleigh, is a nearby proposed impact crater on the Gascoyne platform.

See also 
 Carnarvon Basin
 East Warburton Basin

References

External links 
 WA Geological Survey Meteorite Impacts in Western Australia

Impact craters of Western Australia
Carboniferous impact craters
Devonian impact craters
Carboniferous Australia
Paleozoic Australia
Shark Bay